The Wandering Hill is a novel by Larry McMurtry. It is the second, both in chronological and publishing order, of The Berrybender Narratives.  Set in the year 1833, it recounts the Berrybenders' journey up the Yellowstone River into the Rocky Mountains.

The title refers to a sinister-looking movable hill in Native American legend.  The hill is said to appear at scenes of great tragedy, and is meant to symbolize the ill-conceived and ominous choices the Berrybenders are beginning to make.

2003 American novels
Western (genre) novels
Novels by Larry McMurtry
Fiction set in 1833
Novels set in the 1830s
Northwestern United States in fiction
The Berrybender Narratives